The III Army Corps / III AK was a corps level command of the Prussian and then the Imperial German Armies from the 19th century to World War I.

It was established in 1814 as the General Headquarters in Berlin (Generalkommando in Berlin) and became the III Army Corps on 3 April 1820. Its headquarters was in Berlin and its catchment area was the Province of Brandenburg.

In peacetime, the Corps was assigned to the IV Army Inspectorate, joining the 1st Army at the start of the First World War. It was still in existence at the end of the war in the 7th Army, Heeresgruppe Deutscher Kronprinz on the Western Front. The Corps was disbanded with the demobilisation of the German Army after World War I.

War of the Sixth Coalition 
In 1813 the III Corps fought at the battles of Luckau, Grossbeeren, Dennewitz, Leipzig and Arnhem. In 1814, the corps fought at Hoogstraten and Laon.

Second Schleswig War 
Part of the Corps (10th Brigade of the 5th Division and the 6th Division) fought in the Second Schleswig War of 1864, including the key Battle of Dybbøl, or Düppeler Heights.

Austro-Prussian War 
The III Corps formed part of Prince Friedrich Karl of Prussia's 1st Army and fought in the Austro-Prussian War against Austria in 1866, including the Battle of Königgrätz.

Franco-Prussian War 
In the Franco-Prussian War of 1870-71, the Corps joined the 2nd Army. It saw action in the battles of Spicheren, Mars-la-Tour (a key part), Gravelotte, Beaune-la-Rolande, Orléans, and Le Mans, and in the Siege of Metz.

Peacetime organisation 
The 25 peacetime Corps of the German Army (Guards, I - XXI, I - III Bavarian) had a reasonably standardised organisation. Each consisted of two divisions with usually two infantry brigades, one field artillery brigade and a cavalry brigade each. Each brigade normally consisted of two regiments of the appropriate type, so each Corps normally commanded 8 infantry, 4 field artillery and 4 cavalry regiments. There were exceptions to this rule:
V, VI, VII, IX and XIV Corps each had a 5 infantry brigades (so 10 infantry regiments)
II, XIII, XVIII and XXI Corps had a 9 infantry regiments
I, VI and XVI Corps had a 3 cavalry brigades (so 6 cavalry regiments)
the Guards Corps had 11 infantry regiments (in 5 brigades) and 8 cavalry regiments (in 4 brigades).
Each Corps also directly controlled a number of other units. This could include one or more 
Foot Artillery Regiment
Jäger Battalion
Pioneer Battalion
Train Battalion

World War I

Organisation on mobilisation 
On mobilization on 2 August 1914 the Corps was restructured. 5th Cavalry Brigade was withdrawn to form part of the 2nd Cavalry Division and the 6th Cavalry Brigade was broken up: the 3rd Hussar Regiment was raised to a strength of 6 squadrons before being split into two half-regiments of 3 squadrons each and the half-regiments were assigned as divisional cavalry to 5th and 6th Divisions; the 6th Cuirassier Regiment was likewise assigned as two half-regiments to 22nd and 38th Divisions of XI Corps. Divisions received engineer companies and other support units from the Corps headquarters. In summary, III Corps mobilised with 25 infantry battalions, 9 machine gun companies (54 machine guns), 6 cavalry squadrons, 24 field artillery batteries (144 guns), 4 heavy artillery batteries (16 guns), 3 pioneer companies and an aviation detachment.

Combat chronicle 
On mobilisation, III Corps was assigned to the 1st Army on the right wing of the forces for the Schlieffen Plan offensive in August 1914 on the Western Front. It participated in the Battle of Mons and the First Battle of the Marne which marked the end of the German advances in 1914. Later, it participated in the Battle of Verdun and the Battle of Amiens (1918).

It was still in existence at the end of the war in the 7th Army, Heeresgruppe Deutscher Kronprinz on the Western Front.

Commanders 
The III Corps had the following commanders during its existence:

See also 

Franco-Prussian War order of battle
German Army order of battle (1914)
German Army order of battle, Western Front (1918)
List of Imperial German infantry regiments
List of Imperial German artillery regiments
List of Imperial German cavalry regiments
Order of battle at Mons
Order of battle of the First Battle of the Marne
List of forces involved in the Battle of Amiens

References

Bibliography 
 
 
 

 
 
 

Corps of Germany in World War I
Military units and formations established in 1814
Military units and formations disestablished in 1919